Zanthoxylum myriacanthum is a woody plant from the family Rutaceae.

Description
It has been found in the hillside forests of China, Indonesia, Malaysia, Myanmar, Philippines, and Vietnam.

Classification
It was published in 1875 in The Flora of British India. It was accept in 1995's A catalogue of the Vascular Plants of Malaya Gardens Bulletin Singapore, 2001's Flora of Bhutan, 2003's Danh lục các loài thực vật Việt Nam, and 2014's Plant diversity of Assam.

References

myriacanthum
Flora of China